St. Alban's Episcopal Church, also known as Chapel of the Cross, is a historic Episcopal church building located in Littleton, Halifax County, North Carolina.

History 
It was completed in 1891, and is a mostly vernacular building with the Carpenter Gothic features of lancet windows and doors. On April 20, 2011, the building was added to the National Register of Historic Places.

Current status
St. Alban's Episcopal Church is an active parish in the Episcopal Diocese of North Carolina with regular Sunday services at 9:30 AM.

References

External links
Episcopal Church Directory
Church schedules for Halifax County
Images of interior and exterior of St. Alban's, Littlon

Churches on the National Register of Historic Places in North Carolina
Episcopal church buildings in North Carolina
19th-century Episcopal church buildings
Churches completed in 1891
Carpenter Gothic church buildings in North Carolina
Churches in Halifax County, North Carolina
National Register of Historic Places in Halifax County, North Carolina
1891 establishments in North Carolina